"Bad Day to Let You Go" is a song co-written and recorded by American country music artist Bryan White.  It was released in April 1998 as the third single from the album The Right Place. The song reached No. 30 on the Billboard Hot Country Singles & Tracks chart.  The song was written by White, Bob DiPiero and Derek George.

Chart performance

References

1998 singles
1997 songs
Bryan White songs
Songs written by Bob DiPiero
Songs written by Derek George
Songs written by Bryan White
Song recordings produced by Kyle Lehning
Song recordings produced by Billy Joe Walker Jr.
Asylum Records singles